The 1891 Amateur Hockey Association of Canada season saw the Montreal Hockey Club win the league and Canadian championship for the fourth straight season by beating the Montreal Crescents 8-2. Ontario launched the Ontario Hockey Association (OHA) as the popularity of the sport spread west. Ottawa, the eventual Ontario champion, played in a challenge with Montreal and lost.

Season 
The Dominion Hockey Club did not return to put on a challenge. The Shamrock Athletic Association mounted their first challenge. The Ottawa Hockey Club returned to AHAC play.

Overall challenge record 

Quebec lost to Montreal by default on January 7. As a result, Quebec was not allowed to issue any additional challenges for the 1891 season.

† National champion. The Montreals retained their championship all season without being defeated.

Schedule and results 

Games consisted of a mixture of Challenge games and Exhibition (friendlies)

Game on January 7 was defaulted to Montreal HC by Quebec. Quebec telegraphed that the team would not show.

Player statistics

Goaltending averages 
Note: GP = games played, GA = goals against, SO = shutouts, GAA = Goals against average

Source: Ultimate Hockey

Scoring leaders 
Note: GP = games played, G = goals scored

Source: Ultimate Hockey

17 Goals unaccounted for in statistics

See also 
 1890–91 Ottawa Hockey Club season

References 
 
 
Notes

Amateur Hockey Association of Canada seasons
AHAC